Phon is a district (amphoe) in the southern part of Khon Kaen province, northeastern Thailand.

Geography
Neighbouring districts are (from the west clockwise): Waeng Noi, Waeng Yai, Chonnabot, Non Sila and Nong Song Hong of Khon Kaen Province; Bua Lai and Prathai of Nakhon Ratchasima province.

Administration
The district is divided into 12 subdistricts (tambons), which are further subdivided into 131 villages (mubans). Mueang Phon is a town (thesaban mueang) which covers parts of tambon Mueang Phon. There are a further 12 tambon Administrative Organizations (TAO).

Geocode 2 is not used.

Phon